The 2022 Federated Auto Parts 400 was a NASCAR Cup Series race held on August 14, 2022, at Richmond Raceway in Richmond, Virginia. Contested over 400 laps on the  D-shaped short track, it was the 24th race of the 2022 NASCAR Cup Series season and was won by Kevin Harvick of Stewart-Haas Racing.

Report

Background

Richmond Raceway (RR), formerly known as Richmond International Raceway (RIR), is a 3/4-mile (1.2 km), D-shaped, asphalt race track located just outside Richmond, Virginia, in Henrico County. It hosts the NASCAR Cup Series, the NASCAR Xfinity Series, NASCAR Camping World Truck Series and the IndyCar series. Known as "America's premier short track", it formerly hosted two USAC sprint car races. Chase Young, the 2020 NFL Defensive Rookie of the Year, was the honorary pace car driver.

Entry list
 (R) denotes rookie driver.
 (i) denotes driver who is ineligible for series driver points.

Practice

Practice results

Qualifying

Qualifying results

Race

Stage Results

Stage One
Laps: 70

Stage Two
Laps: 160

Final Stage Results

Stage Three
Laps: 170

Race statistics
 Lead changes: 16 among 9 different drivers
 Cautions/Laps: 5 for 28
 Red flags: 0
 Time of race: 3 hours, 3 minutes and 27 seconds
 Average speed:

Media

Television
USA covered the race on the television side. Rick Allen, Jeff Burton, Steve Letarte and three-time Richmond winner Dale Earnhardt Jr. called the race from the broadcast booth. Dave Burns, Parker Kligerman, and Marty Snider handled the pit road duties from pit lane.

Radio
The Motor Racing Network had the radio call for the race, which was also simulcast on Sirius XM NASCAR Radio. Alex Hayden and Jeff Striegle  called the race from the broadcast booth for MRN when the field races through the front straightaway. Dave Moody called the race from a platform when the field races down the backstraightaway. Winston Kelley, Glenn Jarrett and Kim Coon called the action for MRN from pit lane.

Standings after the race

Drivers' Championship standings

Manufacturers' Championship standings

Note: Only the first 16 positions are included for the driver standings.
. – Driver has clinched a position in the NASCAR Cup Series playoffs.

References

2022 in sports in Virginia
2022 NASCAR Cup Series
2022
August 2022 sports events in the United States
2022 in Richmond, Virginia